The 26th Gran Premio di Roma (Rome Grand Prix), was the fourth round of the 1984 European Championship for F2 Drivers. This was held at the Autodromo Vallelunga Piero Taruffi, to the north of Rome, on 13 May.

Report

Entry
A total of 25 F2 cars were entered for the event, but come qualifying the field was down to just 17 cars.

Qualifying
Mike Thackwell took pole position for Ralt Racing Ltd, in their Ralt-Honda RH6, averaging a speed of 108.969 mph.

Race
The race was held over 65 laps of the Vallelunga circuit. Mike Thackwell took the winner spoils for works Ralt team, driving their Ralt-Honda RH6. The Kiwi won in a time of 1hr 15:59.41mins., averaging a speed of 102.049 mph. Second place went to the other works Ralt of, Roberto Moreno.  The podium was completed by the PMC Motorsport / BS Automotive March of Christian Danner.

Classification

Race Result

 Fastest lap: Mike Thackwell, 1:07.38secs. (106.236 mph)

References

Rome
Rome
Rome Grand Prix